Walsworth Publishing Company is a family-owned publishing company based out of Marceline, Missouri.  Walsworth produces catalogs and periodicals, and is the only American- and family-owned publisher of yearbooks. It was started in 1937 by brothers William, Edward, and Don Walsworth. The current CEO of the company is Don's son, Don O. Walsworth, and the current president is his grandson Don Walsworth. The company operates from administrative offices and printing and binding facilities in Marceline, Missouri. Walsworth owns specialty book publisher Donning Company Publishers and The Ovid Bell Press in Fulton, Missouri, a printer of journals and magazines.

Company history
Walsworth Publishing Company is among the 35 largest printing companies in the United States. It is headquartered in Marceline, Missouri.
 
In 1937, Don Walsworth settled in Marceline to print playbills with a borrowed typewriter and a mimeograph machine. Soon the product line expanded to include cookbooks and, following World War II, memorial books to honor those who had served.
 
In 1947, Walworth began to produce yearbooks. In 1970, the commercial printing division was established to balance the cyclical yearbook production schedule, adding textbooks, catalogs, magazines and other specialty publications to the Walsworth line.
 
Walsworth is still a family-owned company that employs more than 1,250 people worldwide. Over 675 employees have attained Master Printer of America status.
 
The company operates from administrative offices and printing and binding facilities in Marceline, Missouri, a prepress facility in Brookfield, Missouri, a sales and marketing office in Overland Park, Kansas, and a printing facility in St. Joseph, Michigan. Additionally, Walsworth owns the Donning Company Publishers in Virginia Beach, Virginia, a specialty book publisher, and The Ovid Bell Press in Fulton, Missouri, a printer of journals and magazines.

In December 2019, the company announced plans to acquire the Wisconsin-based Ripon Printers.

References

External links
 Walsworth Publishing Company website

Publishing companies of the United States
Companies based in Missouri
Publishing companies established in 1937
Family-owned companies of the United States